Eric Michael Heenan  is a former justice of the Supreme Court of Western Australia, the highest ranking court in the Australian state of Western Australia.

Education 
He was educated at Aquinas College (class of 1962), and the University of Western Australia from which he graduated in 1966. He left his father's firm E.M. Heenan & Co in 1983 to practise as a barrister. He was appointed King's Counsel in 1985.

Career 
He served as president of the WA Bar Association from 1990 to 1992, and as vice-president of the Australian bar association in 1992. He also served as a Commissioner of the Western Australian Supreme Court in 1990 and 1994.

From 1988 to 1994 he served as the deputy chairman of the Aquinas College Board.

He was appointed to the Supreme Court on 4 April 2002. He retired in 2015.

References 

People educated at Aquinas College, Perth
Australian King's Counsel
Judges of the Supreme Court of Western Australia
1945 births
Living people